

Works

Births
 Ramon Llull (died 1315), Catalan writer and philosopher

Deaths

13th-century poetry
Poetry